Splicing factor, suppressor of white-apricot homolog is a protein in humans that is encoded by the SFSWAP gene.

This gene encodes a human homolog of Drosophila splicing regulatory protein. This gene autoregulates its expression by control of splicing of its first two introns. In addition, it also regulates the splicing of fibronectin and CD45 genes. Two transcript variants encoding different isoforms have been identified.

References

External links 
 PDBe-KB provides an overview of all the structure information available in the PDB for Human Splicing factor, suppressor of white-apricot homolog (SFSWAP)